The Gegenmiao massacre or the Gegenmiao incident was a war crime by the Red Army and a part of the local Chinese population against over half of a group of 1,800 Japanese women and children who had taken refuge in the lamasery Gegenmiao/Koken-miao (葛根廟) on August 14, 1945, during the Soviet invasion of Manchuria.

Soviet soldiers committed the massacre in Gegenmiao/Koken-miao (present day: Gegenmiao zhen; 葛根廟鎭), a town in the Horqin Right Front Banner of the Hinggan League of Inner Mongolia. The Red Army shot refugees, ran them over with tanks or trucks, and bayoneted them after they raised a white flag. After two hours, Red Army soldiers had murdered well over one thousand Japanese refugees, mostly women and children. Angry Chinese chased a group of Japanese refugees into a river, where many drowned. Soldiers raped several women and children, sometimes after murdering them. Chinese civilians raped and murdered a Japanese woman after Red Army soldiers murdered her child. The Red Army pursued and murdered a Japanese family that tried to hide in the trenches. The Red Army also beat mothers into submission in order to kidnap their children. In the market, a Japanese boy could sell for 300 yen, and a girl for 500 yen. 

The Red Army murdered over 1,000 Japanese refugees by the end of the massacre.

Aftermath 
Survivors and their families designated August 14 as a day of memorial for the event.

In 2017, a documentary named Witness to the Gegenmiao Massacre was released, directed by a survivor whose mother and little siblings were murdered by Red Army soldiers in the massacre.

References

Citations

Sources

External links
 "私の8・15＜1＞葛根廟事件 戦争はもうたくさん 母は頭に銃弾を浴びていました 川内光雄さん" Nishinippon Shimbun July 19, 2005

1945 in China
Anti-Japanese sentiment in China
Child sexual abuse in China
Chinese war crimes
Japan–Soviet Union relations
Manchukuo
Massacres in China
Massacres committed by China
Massacres committed by the Soviet Union
Massacres in 1945
Massacres of women
Murdered Japanese children
Necrophilia
Rape in China
Soviet World War II crimes
War crimes in China
Wartime sexual violence in World War II
Women in World War II